Dubai Towers - Doha is a super-tall skyscraper with a roof height of  (spire height ) developing in Doha, Qatar. The estimated cost of Dubai Towers - Doha is 2.3 billion Qatari Riyal (US$620 million). When completed, the structure will be the tallest building in Qatar.

Located in the West Bay district of Doha, next to the Doha Corniche, the 90-story multi-use tower is being developed by Sama Dubai, formerly known as Dubai International Properties, the international real estate investment and development arm of Dubai Holding.

The project has been contracted to a joint venture between Al-Habtoor and Al Jaber, while Robert Matthew Johnson Marshall (RMJM) are the architects and engineering consultants. The cost consultants are Hanscomb Consultants Inc. The Project Management consultant is Sama ECH.

When completed the mixed use tower will include a  retail area, 13 floors comprising a 225-room five-star hotel, 29 floors of office space and 31 floors containing 226 luxury apartments and three super luxury penthouses.

The project is now severely delayed as a result of the financial crash in Dubai. Investors in the property have been advised that the building is 9 months behind schedule.  By May 2010 only 29 of the proposed 84 stories had been built. At that building rate, this would suggest at least another 11-year delay until completion.

In February 2022, a few floors have been cladded in dirty glass.

References

External links
 Official Website
 

Skyscrapers in Doha
Buildings and structures under construction in Qatar
Neo-futurism architecture